The ninth season of the Indian Kannada-language reality television game show Bigg Boss premiered on 24 September 2022. It is produced by Endemol Shine India under the control of Banijay and broadcast on Colors Kannada along with a 24/7 Live Stream on Voot with Sudeep as the host for the ninth consecutive year.

Telecast
Bigg Boss Kannada Season 9 is telecasted everyday on Colors Kannada and 24/7 Live Stream on Voot. It contains:

Main Episode (The main episode that is telecasted on Colors Kannada)
TV Ginta Modalu (Main Episode telecast before the airing on TV, only on Voot Select)
24/7 Live Channel (Live telecast from Bigg Boss house, on weekdays, only on Voot Select)
Unseen Kathegalu (Unseen Clips, only on Voot Select)
Extra Masala (Extra Clips)
Bigg Inn (Entry Interview)
Bigg Bang (Exit Interview)
Voot Weekly (Best Compilations)
Voot Fryday (Special Friday Tasks)
Voot Video Vichara (Audience can share their views about the contestants through a video)

Production

Teaser
The show organizers officially released a teaser using the show's logo on 7 September 2022. On 15 September 2022, a new teaser released with host Sudeep and confirmed that the show would premiere on 24 September 2022 on Colors Kannada and Voot.

Contestants
The show is sticking to the original format of the reality programme and it will only have celebrities who will be entering the house as contestants. Bigg Boss Kannada 9 will have a line up of five former Bigg Boss Kannada contestants and Top four contestants of Bigg Boss OTT (Season 1) along with new contestants who will make their Bigg Boss debut. Inclusions were made from Season 1,5,7,8 and OTT season only.

Format
The show follows selected contestants who are isolated from the outside world for 106 days (or 15 weeks) in a custom-built house. The housemates are dictated by an omnipresent entity named Bigg Boss. Each week, one or more of the housemates are evicted by a public vote. The last week, the housemate who gets the most votes, wins the game.

Housemates

Housemates status

  indicates OTT (Season 1) contestant.
  Indicates Season 1 contestant. 
  Indicates Season 5 contestant. 
  Indicates Season 7 contestant. 
  Indicates Season 8 contestant. 
  Indicates New Contestant.

Nomination Table 

  indicates OTT (Season 1) contestant.
  Indicates Season 1 contestant. 
  Indicates Season 5 contestant. 
  Indicates Season 7 contestant. 
  Indicates Season 8 contestant. 
  Indicates New Contestant.
  indicates the House Captain.
  indicates the Nominees for house captaincy.
  indicates that the Housemate was directly nominated for eviction prior to the regular nominations process.
 indicates that the housemate went to secret room.
  indicates that the Housemate was granted immunity from nominations.
  indicates the winner.
  indicates the first runner up.
  indicates the second runner up.
  indicates the third runner up.
  indicates the fourth runner up.
  indicates the contestant has been walked out of the show.
  indicates the contestant has been evicted.
  indicates the contestant was not eligible.

Notes

References

Bigg Boss Kannada
2022 Indian television seasons
Colors Kannada original programming
Kannada-language television shows